The Mississippi River Museum is a museum located on Mud Island, in Memphis, Tennessee.

History

The museum opened in 1982 with the goal of "preserv[ing] and promot[ing] the natural and cultural history of the Lower Mississippi River Valley".

In 1990, businessman Sidney Shlenker (known locally for managing construction of the Memphis Pyramid) planned to shut down the museum to make space for new bars and restaurants on the island. The announcement of these plans was met with backlash by the West Tennessee Historical Society, which cooperated with the Mud Island Foundation and then-Mayor of Memphis Richard Hackett to intervene and save the museum from closure.

In July 2018, the museum was temporarily closed for renovations, citing low attendance rates and a need to update outdated exhibits. The museum reopened in May 2019.

In August 2019, vandals broke into the museum, breaking display cases but not stealing or damaging any of the historical artifacts on display.

Displays and exhibits

The museum is divided into 18 galleries, which display more than 5,000 Mississippi River-relevant historical artifacts altogether. Located just outside of the museum is a scale model of the river.

Several items relevant to the Mississippi River's role in the Civil War are on display, most notably a life-size replica of a Union City-class ironclad gunboat.

The museum is populated by wax sculptures of historical figures linked to the Mississippi River, such as Mark Twain and Mike Fink. A documentary on the several perils of traveling and living on the river (such as boiler explosions and yellow fever) is played at the "Theatre of Horrors". One of the museum's galleries is dedicated to the history of music on the river.

See also
List of maritime museums in the United States

References

History museums in Tennessee
Maritime museums in Tennessee
Military and war museums in Tennessee
Music museums in Tennessee
Museums in Memphis, Tennessee